Anaphleps is a monotypic moth genus in the subfamily Arctiinae described by Rothschild in 1916. It contains the single species Anaphleps angustipennis, which is found on Vulcan Island, Papua New Guinea.

References

External links

Lithosiini
Moths described in 1916
Monotypic moth genera
Moths of New Guinea